Yanıqlı (also, Yanykhly, historically Khaghkhagh or Xałxał) is a village and municipality in the Tovuz Rayon of Azerbaijan.  It has a population of 2,395.  The municipality consists of the villages of Yanıqlı, Böyük Xoşdarlı, Sadıqlı, and Kəcavənd.

References 

Populated places in Tovuz District